Hong Kong Buddhist Cemetery is a private cemetery located in Cape Collinson, on Hong Kong Island, Hong Kong. It is managed by The Hong Kong Buddhist Association. The cemetery was completed and opened in 1963.

Notable burials
 Lee Chi Hung (1891–1967), founder of Sun Hing Group of Companies
 Henry Fok (1923–2006), Vice Chairman of the CPPCC (1993–2006)
 Li Ka-suen, brother of Li Ka-shing
 Li Ka-chiu, second brother of Li Ka-shing
 Chong Yuet Ming (1933–1990), wife of Li Ka-shing
 S.C. Tung (1881–1932), grandfather of Tung Chee-hwa
 Ho Sin Hang (1900–1997), co-founder of Hang Seng Bank
 Wu Chung (1902–1991), father of Gordon Wu

See also
 List of cemeteries in Hong Kong

References

External links
 

Cemeteries in Hong Kong
Chai Wan